The Neil A. Kjos Music Company is an American music publisher based in San Diego, California. It has published a large number of books used to teach music, most notably the Standard of Excellence series of books and software.

History
The Neil A. Kjos Music Company was founded by its namesake in Chicago in 1936 as a one-room operation in space rented from the Lyons Band Instrument Company. By 1957, the company had outgrown the premises at Lyons and built a 20,000 square foot plant in Park Ridge, Illinois. Neil A Kjos, Jr., soon began working for the company after receiving degrees from St. Olaf College and Teachers College, Columbia University, and serving in the 524th Air Force Band. During his studies, Neil Jr. met Jane Smisor Bastien, future author of the best-selling piano methods around the world. Neil Jr. acquired the title of president when his father retired in 1969.

In 1973, Neil Jr. determined that the company should expand to a part of the country with a more reasonable climate. A location in San Diego, California, was selected for the construction of a new plant. After completion in 1975, the Neil A. Kjos Music Company operated from both San Diego and Park Ridge. In 1985, the Park Ridge location closed, and all operations were transferred to the newly expanded facility in San Diego.

Neil Jr.’s two children, Mark and Tim, joined the company in the mid-1980s. Upon Neil Jr.’s retirement in 2000, Mark and Tim, with their business and music backgrounds, took over.

Music publishing companies of the United States
Companies based in San Diego
Publishing companies established in 1936
1936 establishments in Illinois
American companies established in 1936